CREA may refer to:
 Agglomeration community of Rouen-Elbeuf-Austreberthe (French: Communauté d'agglomération Rouen-Elbeuf-Austreberthe)
 Canadian Real Estate Association
 Centre de Recherche en Epistémologie Appliquée (CREA, Paris) -- in English
 Centre for Research on Energy and Clean Air, (CREA, Helsinki) an NGO think tank, quoted by the BBC
 Council of Republicans for Environmental Advocacy
 Cranial evolutionary allometry
 CREA, pseudonym of the female Japanese singer Ayumi Hamasaki
 Creating Resources for Empowerment in Action, a feminist human rights organization based in Delhi

Crea may refer to:
 The Honda CHF50, known as the "Crea" in Japan
 Sacro Monte di Crea, a sacro monte (lit. 'sacred mount') near Serralunga di Crea
 Serralunga di Crea, a municipality in Piedmont, Italy
 The Video Game titled 'Crea', which started development in 2017.